Bob Desjarlais was a prominent labour leader in Thompson, Manitoba, Canada, having served as president of the United Steelworkers of America Local 6166 in the 1990s.

Biography 
He represented Inco workers through difficult contract negotiations in 1999, which included an extended lockout and community polarization.  Shortly after the contract was settled, Inco announced that it would expand operations, and keep the Birchtree Mine open for at least another fifteen years.  Desjarlais negotiated a 4.3% wage increase for workers in 2002, and strongly endorsed a new three-year contract in 2005.  He has also been involved in labour activism at the provincial, national and international levels.  In 1996, he represented the Steelworkers in merger talks with the United Auto Workers and the International Association of Machinists.  Four years later, he was cheered at a meeting of the Canadian Labour Congress for criticizing Buzz Hargrove's suggestion that the CLC consider withdrawing its support from the New Democratic Party.  He supported Bill Blaikie for the federal NDP leadership later in the same year.  Within the Manitoba New Democratic Party, Desjarlais has been a vocal advocate for anti-scab legislation.  He has also been active in aboriginal issues, and promoted an urban reserve for Thompson in 2002.

References 

1954 births
2021 deaths
United Steelworkers people
Canadian trade unionists
People from Thompson, Manitoba
People from Qu'Appelle, Saskatchewan